Statistics of Primera División Uruguaya for the 1979 season.

Overview
It was contested by 13 teams, and Peñarol won the championship.

League standings

References
Uruguay - List of final tables (RSSSF)

Uruguayan Primera División seasons
1
Uru